"I Had the Craziest Dream" is a popular song which was published in 1942.  The music was written by Harry Warren, the lyrics by Mack Gordon.

Background
The song was introduced by Harry James and his orchestra, with vocals by Helen Forrest, in the film Springtime in the Rockies (1942).

Chart performance
James and Forrest recorded the song for Columbia Records (catalog No. 36659) on July 23, 1942 and their recording topped the Billboard charts during a 22-week stay. On the Harlem Hit Parade chart it peaked at number four.

Other recordings
 1942 Tony Martin recorded the song with Victor Young and His Orchestra for Decca Records (catalog No.4394A) on July 19, 1942.
 1943 Vera Lynn - a single release.
 1953 The Skylarks - their recording was a #28 hit, 
 1956 Helen Forrest - included in the album Miss Helen Forrest – Voice of the Name Bands.
 1956 Lita Roza - for her album Love Is the Answer.
 1957 Doris Day included the song on her album Hooray for Hollywood (1958).
 1957 Perry Como - for his album We Get Letters.
 1958 Nat King Cole - his recording was eventually included in a compilation album called The Unforgettable Nat Cole Sings The Great Songs! in 1966.
 1960 Kenny Dorham - for his album Quiet Kenny.
 1960 - a single by Adam Wade.
 1961 Frankie Vaughan - included in his album Warm Feeling.
 1965 Al Hirt released a version on his album, They're Playing Our Song. 
 1965 Doris Day - Doris Day's Sentimental Journey.
 1967 Astrud Gilberto reached #31 on Billboard's Easy listening survey with her remake. 
 1968 Italian-American singer Sergio Franchi recorded the song on his RCA Victor album I'm a Fool to Want You.
 1969 Ray Charles recorded the song for his ABC/Tangerine album I'm All Yours, Baby!
 1980 Frank Sinatra - for Trilogy: Past Present Future
 1986 Johnny Mathis - for his album The Hollywood Musicals.

In popular culture
The song was featured in the first Hit Kit, the U.S. Army's version of successful radio show Your Hit Parade.

References

Songs about dreams
1942 songs
1943 singles
Songs with music by Harry Warren
Songs with lyrics by Mack Gordon
Songs written for films
Al Hirt songs
Number-one singles in the United States